Stephen Thomas Hughes (born 26 January 1984) is an English retired footballer who played as a midfielder in the Football League for Brentford. After his release in 2004, he dropped into non-league football.

Career statistics

References

1984 births
English footballers
English Football League players
Brentford F.C. players
Welling United F.C. players
Farnborough F.C. players
Maidenhead United F.C. players
Footballers from Greater London
Living people
Association football midfielders